Nebria lyelli is a species of ground beetle in the Nebriinae subfamily that is endemic to the U.S. state of California.

References

lyelli
Beetles described in 1925
Beetles of North America
Endemic fauna of California
Fauna without expected TNC conservation status